The Pyramid, also called Pyramid Dome, is a young lava dome on the northeast flank of Mount Edziza in British Columbia, Canada. It is on the northeastern edge of the Tencho Glacier and represents several different styles of volcanic activity on the Mount Edziza complex. It is in the Northern Cordilleran Volcanic Province and last erupted during the Pleistocene period.

See also
 Mount Edziza volcanic complex
 List of volcanoes in Canada
 List of Northern Cordilleran volcanoes
 Volcanism of Canada
 Volcanism of Western Canada

References
 

Mount Edziza volcanic complex
Two-thousanders of British Columbia
Pleistocene lava domes